Telmatochromis brichardi is a species of cichlid from the tribe Lamprologini, part of the subfamily Pseudocrenilabrinae, endemic to Lake Tanganyika. It feeds on algae in rocky habitat. It is a cavity nester which forms temporary pairs for breeding, in which the male defends the territory and the female tends the brood. The specific name honours the aquarium fish dealer Pierre Brichard (1921-1990).

References

brichardi
Taxa named by Paul V. Louisy
Fish described in 1989